Events from the year 1975 in Sweden

Incumbents
 Monarch – Carl XVI Gustaf
 Prime Minister – Olof Palme

Events

 24 April – West German Embassy siege in Stockholm.
 14 May – The Parliament of Sweden in Stockholm passes an act, encouraging immigrants to keep the language and culture of their native countries.

Births

20 February – Niclas Wallin, ice hockey player
 4 April – Thobias Fredriksson, cross country skier.
 10 April – Rickard Söderberg, tenor, singer and debater
 15 May – Peter Iwers, rock bassist  
 11 June – Ulrika Bergman, curler.
 27 August – Björn Gelotte, rock musician

Exact date unknown 
 Anders Göthberg, guitarist (died 2008)

Deaths

 17 January – Curt Hartzell, gymnast (born 1891).
 8 September – Erik Adlerz, diver (born 1892), won two Olympic gold medals in 1912.

See also
 1975 in Swedish television

References

 
Sweden
Years of the 20th century in Sweden